The Guatemalan vole (Microtus guatemalensis) is a species of rodent in the family Cricetidae.
It is found in Guatemala and Chiapas, Mexico, in montane pine-oak forest and meadow at elevations between 2600 and 3100 m above sea level. It is terrestrial and probably diurnal or crepuscular.

References

Guatemalan Vole
Rodents of Central America
Mammals of Mexico
Mammals described in 1898
Taxonomy articles created by Polbot
Taxa named by Clinton Hart Merriam